Lieutenant General Nguyễn Bảo Trị (born January 26, 1929) was an officer of the Army of the Republic of Vietnam.

He served as the commander of III Corps, which oversaw the region of the country surrounding the capital Saigon, from 1 October 1965 until 9 June of the next year, when he was replaced by Lieutenant General Le Nguyen Khang.

He was later promoted to Sub-Brigadier General and served as the Commander of the 7th Infantry Regiment which encompassed the areas of Kien Tuong, Qinh-Tuong, Go-Cong, Kien-Hoa and the seaport of Thanh-Phong.

Notes

References 

1929 births
Army of the Republic of Vietnam generals